Morel's Invention is a 1974 Italian science fiction film directed by Emidio Greco and starring Anna Karina. It is based on the novel The Invention of Morel by Adolfo Bioy Casares.

Cast
 Anna Karina as Faustine 
 Giulio Brogi as The Castaway
 John Steiner as Morel
 Anna-Maria Gherardi
 Ezio Marano
 Claudio Trionfi
 Laura De Marchi
 Valeria Sabel
 Roberto Herlitzka

References

External links

1974 films
1970s Italian-language films
1970s science fiction films
Films directed by Emidio Greco
Italian science fiction films
1974 directorial debut films
Films scored by Nicola Piovani
1970s Italian films